Becherer is a German surname. Notable people with the surname include:

Antonia Becherer (born 1963), German ice dancer
Ferdinand Becherer (born 1963), German ice dancer
Hans W. Becherer (1935–2016), American businessman
Kelley Becherer (born 1990), American Paralympic swimmer

German-language surnames